Gaehwa Station is the only elevated station and western terminus of Seoul Subway Line 9. It is located near the border of Gimpo. It houses the headquarters of the Seoul Metro Line 9 Corporation.

Station layout

References

Railway stations opened in 2009
Seoul Metropolitan Subway stations
Metro stations in Gangseo District, Seoul